Eric Bennie Cochran (18 June 1890 – 12 April 1969) was an Australian rules footballer who played with Carlton in the Victorian Football League (VFL). Born in Ballarat and recruited from Golden Point, he played nine consecutive matches during the later part of the 1912 season, all of which Carlton won. Cochran holds the record for the most VFL/AFL career games without playing in a losing team.

Notes

External links 

Eric Cochran's profile at Blueseum

1890 births
Carlton Football Club players
Golden Point Football Club players
1969 deaths
Australian rules footballers from Ballarat